Billboard Top Rock'n'Roll Hits: 1959 is a compilation album released by Rhino Records in 1988, featuring 10 hit recordings from 1959.

All the tracks reached the top 10 of the Billboard Hot 100 singles chart, eight of which went to #1. The exceptions, both peaking at number 2, were "Charlie Brown" and "16 Candles."

Reception
"This budget ten-song selection has much to recommend it. Top-notch transfers make this one a great value." - Cub Koda for Allmusic.

Track listing
Track information and credits taken from the album's liner notes.

References

Billboard Top Rock'n'Roll Hits albums
1988 compilation albums
Pop rock compilation albums